The 1929 International cricket season was from April 1929 to August 1929.

Season overview

June

Test Trial in England

South Africa in England

July

Scotland in Ireland

References

1929 in cricket